Ján Sokol (born 13 September 1985, in Bardejov) is a Slovak football striker who currently plays for SV Bad Ischl. His former club was Partizán Bardejov.

External links
at hracskekarty.cz

References

1985 births
Living people
Slovak footballers
Association football forwards
FK Dubnica players
ŠK Slovan Bratislava players
FC Hlučín players
Partizán Bardejov players
Slovak Super Liga players
Expatriate footballers in the Czech Republic
Expatriate footballers in Austria
People from Bardejov
Sportspeople from the Prešov Region